Senna alexandrina (Alexandrian senna, in Arabic عشرج or عشرق or سنامكي and see below) is an ornamental plant in the genus Senna. It is used in herbalism. It grows natively in upper Egypt, especially in the Nubian region, and near Khartoum (Sudan), where it is cultivated commercially. It is also grown elsewhere, notably in India and Somalia.

Description
Alexandrian Senna is a shrubby plant that reaches 0.5–1 metres (20" to 40"), rarely two metres (6') in height with a branched, pale-green erect stem and long spreading branches bearing four or five pairs of leaves. These leaves form complex, feathery, mutual pairs. The leaflets vary from 4 to 6 pairs, fully edged, with a sharp top. The midribs are equally divided at the base of the leaflets.

The flowers are in a raceme interior blossoms, big in size, coloured yellow that tends to brown. Its legume fruit are horned, broadly oblong, compressed and flat and contain about six seeds.

Uses
When cultivated as medicinal herb, the plants are cut down semi-annually, dried in the sun, stripped and packed in palm-leaf bags. They are then sent on camels to Essouan and Darao, then down the Nile to Cairo or else to Red Sea ports. Trade in senna provides a significant source of income for the nomadic Ababda.

Names and taxonomy
Senna alexandrina is also known under the names Egyptian senna, Tinnevelly senna, East Indian senna or the French séné de la palthe.

It received the names Alexandrian senna and Egyptian senna because Alexandria in Egypt was the main trade port in past times. The fruits and leaves were transported from Nubia and Sudan and other places to Alexandria, then from it and across the Mediterranean sea to Europe and adjacent Asia.

Though it might look like a scientific name, Cassia Officinalis is actually the apothecary term for this plant, and hence Officinalis—the Latin adjective denoting tools, utensils and medical compounds—is written with an initial upper-case letter, unlike specific epithets, which are always written with an initial lower-case letter today.

Synonyms:
 Cassia acutifolia Delile
 Cassia alexandrina (Garsault) Thell.
 Cassia angustifolia M. Vahl
 Cassia lanceolata Collad.
C. lanceolata Link is a synonym of Senna sophera  var. sophera)
C. lanceolata Pers. is a synonym of Chamaecrista desvauxii var. mollissima
 Cassia lenitiva Bisch.
 Cassia senna L.
 Senna acutifolia (Delile) Batka
 Senna alexandrina Garsault
 Senna angustifolia (Vahl) Batka

Medicinal use
Historically, Senna alexandrina was used in the form of senna pods, or as herbal tea made from the leaves, as a laxative. It also serves as a fungicide.

Modern medicine has used extracts since at least the 1950s as a laxative. If accidentally ingested by infants, it can cause side effects such as severe diaper rash.  The active ingredients are several senna glycosides which interact with immune cells in the colon.

See also 
 List of herbs with known adverse effects

References

Further reading
  (1993): Medicinal plants & Aromatic plants - Its chemistry-production-benefits (2nd ed.). Dar el Maaref, Alexandria. النباتات الطبية والعطرية : كيمياؤها ، انتاجها ، فوائدها / تاليف محمد السيد هيكل ، عبد الله عبد الرزاق عمر. منشاة المعارف ]
  (2005): Genera Cassia and Senna. Version 10.01, November 2005. Retrieved 2007-DEC-20.
  (1982): The American Cassiinae. Memoirs of the New York Botanical Garden 35: 1-918

External links 

 Senna alexandrina profile at botanical.com

alexandrina
Flora of Africa
Flora of the Arabian Peninsula
Medicinal plants
Subshrubs
Taxa named by Philip Miller